Crambus themistocles is a moth in the family Crambidae. It was described by Stanisław Błeszyński in 1961. It is found in South Africa, where it has been recorded from KwaZulu-Natal.

References

Endemic moths of South Africa
Crambini
Moths described in 1961
Moths of Africa